Mulberry Bush may refer to:

 The nursery rhyme Here We Go Round the Mulberry Bush
 Pop Goes the Weasel, which references a mulberry bush in at least one verse of the song.
 Mulberry Bush School, an independent residential special school in Standlake, Oxfordshire